BioMotiv is an accelerator company associated with The Harrington Project, a $340 million initiative centered at University Hospitals of Cleveland. Therapeutic opportunities are identified through relationships with The Harrington Discovery Institute, university and research institutions, disease foundations, and industry sources. Once opportunities are identified, BioMotiv oversees the development, funding, active management, and partnering of the therapeutic products.

History
The Harrington Project was launched as an effort to bridge varying aspects of the drug development sphere. In response to recent decline in the number of traditional, early-stage biotechnology venture capital firms, BioMotiv utilizes an asset-centric model to in-license, fund, and manage technologies in-house. Its goal is to address the "valley of death"  between research, discovery, and early clinical-stage drug development. Projects are advanced by the management team through clinical proof-of-concept and then out-licensed via strategic alliances with pharmaceutical companies.

The company has raised over $146 million to date. Major investors include The Harrington Family, University Hospitals of Cleveland, Takeda Pharmaceutical Company, Biogen, Arix Bioscience and Charles River Laboratories.

Leadership
Ron Harrington, BioMotiv's Board of Managers Chairman and The Harrington Project's lead, led Edgepark Medical Supplies and after growing the business successfully, sold the company in 2011 to Goldman Sachs and Clayton, Dubilier & Rice (which renamed the company AssuraMed and sold it again in 2014 to Cardinal Health, Inc.).

BioMotiv recruited Baiju Shah, former CEO of BioEnterprise, a non-profit aimed at boosting Cleveland's healthcare economy, to lead its efforts. Prior to founding BioEnterprise, Baiju worked at McKinsey & Company.

Ted Torphy is BioMotiv's Chief Scientific Officer. Prior to BioMotiv, he served as Global Head of External Innovation & Business Models for Discovery Sciences, Vice President and Head of External Research and Early Development, and Corporate Vice President and Head of Johnson & Johnson's Corporate Office of Science & Technology.

David C. U'Prichard is Chairman of the Advisory Board; he has served on a number of biotechnology boards, as a venture partner at several funds, and was Chairman of Research and Development at SmithKline Beecham.

Subsidiaries
BioMotiv launched its first subsidiary company, Orca Pharmaceuticals, in 2013. Based in Oxford, England, it worked in collaboration with New York University Innovation Venture Fund to develop RAR-related orphan receptor gamma (RORy) inhibitors for treatments of psoriasis, ankylosing spondylitis and inflammatory bowel disease.

Today, BioMotiv's subsidiary portfolio includes ten companies across five indication areas:

Partnerships
BioMotiv's strategic partners include leaders in the drug development and pharmaceutical industries, as well as disease foundations.

In September 2014, BioMotiv entered into its first strategic partnership with Takeda Pharmaceutical Company in the areas of Immunology & Inflammation and Cardio-metabolic Diseases.

Today, BioMotiv has four strategic partners:

 Takeda 
 Biogen
 Arix Bioscience
 Charles River Laboratories

See also
Medical Research
Translational Research
Biotechnology

Further reading
Crossing Over the Valley of Death. Faster Cures. Faster Cures
Biotech Funding Gets Harder to Find. Wall Street Journal. Wall Street Journal

References

External links
BioMotiv,
The Harrington Project

Categories

Companies based in Cleveland
Biotechnology